Ernst Gorsemann (15 February 1886 – 19 July 1960) was a German sculptor. His work was part of the sculpture event in the art competition at the 1928 Summer Olympics.

References

1886 births
1970 deaths
20th-century German sculptors
20th-century German male artists
German male sculptors
Olympic competitors in art competitions
Artists from Bremen